José Agustín Ramírez Gómez (born 19 August 1944) is a Mexican novelist, short story writer, essayist and screenwriter. He is considered as one of the most influential and prolific Mexican writers of the second half of the 20th century.

Career
José Agustín was born in Acapulco, Mexico on 19 August 1944. He studied Classical Literature  at the School of Philosophy and Letters of the National Autonomous University of Mexico, Film direction at the Centro Universitario de Estudios Cinematográficos and Dramaturgy at the Instituto Nacional de Bellas Artes y Literatura.

Agustín participated in Juan José Arreola's writers' workshop from 1962 to 1965, where he wrote his first novel, La Tumba (The Tomb), when he was nineteen years old. The novel was the brief but provocative story of a Mexican upperclass teen, deemed indecent by the public but gathering praise from older writers. This and his most famous work, De Perfil (Profile view), a fast and detailed view of three days in the main character's life, show stylistic similarities to James Joyce's work, especially A Portrait of the Artist as a Young Man.

He was considered a member of the so-called Onda literature, onda (wave) being slang for current and fashionable views in the eyes of young people.

A common technique in his work is mixing character's speech with narrative, without making any kind of distinction (free indirect discourse). Thus the reader finds a long dialogue written in a single sentence, and is expected to realize which character is speaking as he reads the words. He also makes use of the stream of consciousness technique.

Agustin has taught at the University of Denver, the University of California, Irvine and the University of New Mexico.

Awards
 1977: Guggenheim Fellowship
 1993: Premio Nacional de Literatura Juan Ruiz de Alarcón
 2011: Premio Nacional de Ciencias y Artes

Bibliography

Novels

La Tumba (1964)
De Perfil (1966)
Abolición de la propiedad (1969)
Se está haciendo tarde (1973)
El rey se acerca a su templo (1978)
Ciudades Desiertas (1982)
Cerca del fuego (1986)
La panza del Tepozteco (1992)
Dos horas de sol (1994)
Vida con mi viuda (2004)
Armablanca (2006)

Short Stories
Inventando que sueño (1968)
La mirada en el centro (1977)
No hay censura (1988)
No pases esta puerta (1992)
La miel derramada (1992)

Plays
Círculo vicioso (1974)

Essays
La nueva música clásica (1968)
Literature and censorship in Latin America Today: Dream within a dream (1978)
Tragicomedia Mexicana: La vida en Mexico de 1940 a 1970. Tomo 1 (1990)
Tragicomedia Mexicana: La vida en Mexico de 1970 a 1982. Tomo 2 (1992)
Tragicomedia Mexicana: La vida en Mexico de 1982 a 1994. Tomo 3 (2007)
Camas de campo, campos de batalla (1994)
La Contracultura en Mexico (1996)
El hotel de los corazones solitarios (1996)
Los grandes discos de rock 1951-1975 (1996)

Chronicles
Contra la corriente (1991)

Autobiography
Quién soy, dónde estoy, qué me dieron (1966)
El rock de la cárcel (1986)
Diario de brigadista: Cuba 1961 (2011)

Filmography
5 de chocolate y 1 de fresa (1968)
Luz externa (1974)
El año de la peste (1979)

In popular culture

The Mexican band Belafonte Sensacional wrote the song "Epic Aris" inspired by the literary works of José Agustín and Parménides García Saldaña, another writer that was considered a member of La Onda literature.

See also
List of people from Morelos, Mexico

References

1944 births
Living people
Mexican male novelists
Mexican male writers
People from Acapulco